St. John Township is an inactive township in New Madrid County, in the U.S. state of Missouri.

St. John Township takes its name from St. John Bayou.

References

Townships in Missouri
Townships in New Madrid County, Missouri